HRDC may be:

Harvard Radcliffe Dramatic Club, Harvard University
Human Resources Development Canada
Human Resource Development Council, Montana
Human Rights Defense Center, publisher of Prison Legal News
Human Rights Documentation Centre, India